Mexikói út (lit. Mexican street) is the northern terminus of the yellow M1 (Millennium Underground) line of the Budapest Metro. Located in the Zugló district of Pest, the station was opened on 30 December 1973 when the line was extended from the original terminus at Városliget (City Park).

Connections 
The station provides onward connections with the following  BKV services:
 Bus: 25, 32, 225
 Trolleybus: 74, 74A
 Tram: 1, 3, 69

References

M1 (Budapest Metro) stations
Railway stations opened in 1973
1973 establishments in Hungary